The 2014 São Tomé and Principe Championship was the 29th season of the São Tomé and Principe Championship the top-level football championship of São Tomé and Principe. It began in 10 May (a week later than scheduled
) and concluded on December 17.  Two national final matches occurred in the season.  UDRA from São Tomé island won their first and only title.

Teams
36 teams participated in the São Tomé and Principe Championship, 30 from São Tomé Island (10 in each division) and 6 from Príncipe Island. At the end of season champion of São Tomé Island League and champion of Principe Island League play one match for champion of São Tomé and Principe.

São Tomé teams 2014

Premier Division

Ten clubs participated in the 2014 season (third time since its reduction), UDRA won their first and only title and went on to participate in the national championship match for the first time in November.  Guadalupe and Trindade were relegated in the season.

Teams

League table

Second Division

The second division featured 10 clubs.  Correia, Folha Fede and Santana, three clubs elevated into the premier division and Cruz Vermelha and UDESCAI were relegated into the third division.
 1st: Folha Fede - elevated into the 2015 São Tomé Island Premier Division
 Agrosport
 Amador
 UD Correia - elevated into the 2015 São Tomé Island Premier Division
 Cruz Vermelha - relegated into the 2015 São Tomé Island Third Division
 6 de Setembro - withdrawn from competition after the end of the season
 Inter Bom-Bom
 Micoló
 Santana FC - elevated into the 2015 São Tomé Island Premier Division
 UDESCAI - relegated into the 2015 São Tomé Island Third Division

Third Division
The third division featured 10 clubs.  Porto Alegre and Ribeira Peixe were elevated into the second division.

 Andorinha
 Boa Vista
 Conde 
 Diogo Vaz 
 Otótó	
 Palmar - withdrawn from the competition at the end of the season
 Porto Alegre - elevated into the 2015  São Tomé Island Second Division
 Ribeira Peixe - elevated into the 2015 São Tomé Second Division
 Sporting São Tomé    			
 Varzim

Clubs not in competition
Bela Vista

Principe teams 2014

Six clubs took part in the 2014 season.  Again FC Porto Real won another title and participated in the national championship match in November.

League table

National final

Two national final matches took place on November 13 and 17 at noon, four days apart. The match featured FC Porto Real from Príncipe and UDRA from São Tome Island.  Porto Real won the first leg 2-1, the last goal for Porto Real was a penalty kick scored by Joy and UDRA won the second 1-0 and UDRA won the penalty shootouts to become the twelfth and most recent club to win the first title.  UDRA was to achieve entry into the 2015 CAF Champions League, the qualification dispute did not brought UDRA to the African competition by the São Tomean Football Federation (FSF)

References

Football competitions in São Tomé and Príncipe
Sao
Championship